This is an incomplete list of Alloa Athletic Football Club seasons up to the present day. The list details Alloa's record in major league and cup competitions, and the club's top league goal scorer of each season. Top scorers in bold were also the top scorers in Alloa's division that season. Records of competitions such as the Stirlingshire Cup are not included.

Formed as Alloa in 1880, the football club shortly changed its name to Alloa Association, and then to Alloa Athletic in 1881. In 1883 the club was admitted to the Scottish Football Association but had to wait until 1921 before being elected to the Scottish Football League.

Seasons

Key

 P = Played
 W = Games won
 D = Games drawn
 L = Games lost
 F = Goals for
 A = Goals against
 Pts = Points
 Pos = Final position

 R1 = Round 1
 R2 = Round 2
 R3 = Round 3
 R4 = Round 4
 QF = Quarter-finals
 SF = Semi-finals
 SFL 1 = Scottish First Division
 SFL 2 = Scottish Second Division
 SFL 3 = Scottish Third Division

Notes

References

Seasons
 
Alloa Athletic